Mariano García Remón (born 30 September 1950) is a Spanish retired football player and coach.

A former goalkeeper, he is best known for his spell at Real Madrid, which he helped to six La Liga and three Copa del Rey trophies. He subsequently worked as a manager, having a brief stint with his main club.

Playing career
Born in Madrid, Remón finished his football development with country giants Real Madrid, but served two loans in the third and second divisions before returning in 1971. He then began an interesting battle for first-choice status with Miguel Ángel González which would last for the vast majority of his stay: Remón would start from 1971 to 1973 and 1979 to 1981, and the pair split appearances in two other seasons.

In the 1972–73 European Cup quarter-finals against FC Dynamo Kyiv, in the 0–0 first leg draw in Odessa, Remón's heroic efforts earned him the nickname El gato de Odesa ("the cat of Odessa"). After only eight La Liga appearances in his final five seasons combined, being third-choice for the side that won back-to-back UEFA Cups, he retired at almost 36 with 231 overall appearances for the club to his credit.

Remón earned two caps for Spain during five months in 1973, both in friendlies. His debut came on 2 May, playing the second half of a 2–3 loss in the Netherlands.

Coaching career
Remón's coaching career started with the youth sides of Real Madrid. From there he progressed to their reserves, preceding his assistant coach Rafael Benítez.

Subsequently, Remón managed Sporting de Gijón (top division), Albacete Balompié, UD Las Palmas, UD Salamanca, CD Numancia (top flight) and Córdoba CF. Both of his appointments in that competition ended prematurely, when the teams were in a relegation position.

In the 2004–05 campaign, Remón became assistant coach to newly appointed Real Madrid coach José Antonio Camacho, his teammate for 13 years. On 20 September 2004, the former succeeded the latter, who resigned his post just a few weeks into his appointment when the team was in eighth place – Remón himself was sacked due to perceived lack of success by Christmas, and replaced with former Brazilian national side boss Vanderlei Luxemburgo; his Real overall record would consist of 12 wins, four draws and four losses.

Ahead of 2006–07's second level, Remón succeeded former Real Oviedo and Real Betis player Oli at the helm of Cádiz CF, leaving shortly after his arrival as the club eventually failed to return to the first division.

Honours

Player
Real Madrid
La Liga: 1971–72, 1974–75, 1975–76, 1977–78, 1978–79, 1979–80
Copa del Rey: 1973–74, 1974–75, 1979–80, 1981–82

Manager
Castilla
Segunda División B: 1990–91

References

External links

1950 births
Living people
Footballers from Madrid
Spanish footballers
Association football goalkeepers
La Liga players
Segunda División players
Real Madrid CF players
Talavera CF players
Real Oviedo players
Spain under-23 international footballers
Spain amateur international footballers
Spain international footballers
Spanish football managers
La Liga managers
Segunda División managers
Segunda División B managers
Real Madrid Castilla managers
Sporting de Gijón managers
Albacete Balompié managers
UD Las Palmas managers
UD Salamanca managers
CD Numancia managers
Córdoba CF managers
Real Madrid CF managers
Cádiz CF managers